The 1996 United States House of Representatives elections in South Carolina were held on November 5, 1996, to select six Representatives for two-year terms from the state of South Carolina.  The primary elections for the Democrats and the Republicans were held on June 11.  All six incumbents were re-elected and the composition of the state delegation remained four Republicans and two Democrats.

1st congressional district
Incumbent Republican Congressman Mark Sanford of the 1st congressional district, in office since 1995, defeated Natural Law candidate Joseph F. Innella.

General election results

|-
| 
| colspan=5 |Republican hold
|-

2nd congressional district
Incumbent Republican Congressman Floyd Spence of the 2nd congressional district, in office since 1971, defeated Natural Law candidate Maurice T. Raiford.

General election results

|-
| 
| colspan=5 |Republican hold
|-

3rd congressional district
Incumbent Republican Congressman Lindsey Graham of the 3rd congressional district, in office since 1995, defeated Democratic challenger Debbie Dorn.

General election results

|-
| 
| colspan=5 |Republican hold
|-

4th congressional district
Incumbent Republican Congresswoman Bob Inglis of the 4th congressional district, in office since 1993, defeated Democratic challenger Darrell E. Curry.

General election results

|-
| 
| colspan=5 |Republican hold
|-

5th congressional district
Incumbent Democratic Congressman John M. Spratt, Jr. of the 5th congressional district, in office since 1983, defeated Republican challenger Larry Bigham.

General election results

|-
| 
| colspan=5 |Democratic hold
|-

6th congressional district
Incumbent Democratic Congressman Jim Clyburn of the 6th congressional district, in office since 1993, defeated Republican challenger Gary McLeod.

Democratic primary

Republican primary

General election results

|-
| 
| colspan=5 |Democratic hold
|-

See also
United States House elections, 1996
United States Senate election in South Carolina, 1996
South Carolina's congressional districts

External links
South Carolina Election Returns

United States House of Representatives
South Carolina
1996